Penthophera lutea is an owlet moth species. It was first described by Jean Baptiste Boisduval in 1847. It is found in South Africa.

References

Endemic moths of South Africa
Lymantriinae
Moths described in 1847